The Rebel is a 1993 Italian drama film, originally released as based on the novel 'Storia di Enza', which was written and adapted by the film's director, Aurelio Grimaldi.  It stars Spanish actress Penélope Cruz. It also features Stefano Dionisi, Lorenza Indovina and Marco Leonardi. In Italian, the language the film was originally released in, the film is titled La Ribelle.

Plot summary
Enza, 16, a drop out, is arrested with her older sister, Rosaria, for shoplifting. They're sent to a reformatory run by hard-nosed nuns. The girls tease Enza because she's a virgin. So, on the first Sunday she's allowed a pass, she goes to bed with Sebastiano, a young street vendor who chats her up. Enza thinks it's love, but when the authorities ask him if he wants her to live with him, he says no. On her next visit home, Enza meets Franchino. He seems nicer and passes her test: he sleeps beside her but keeps his hands off. This must be love, she thinks. Then, through her sister, she sees another side of Franchino. Now pregnant, Enza has major, long-term decisions to make.

References

External links
 
 

1993 films
1993 drama films
1990s Italian-language films
Films directed by Aurelio Grimaldi
Italian drama films
1990s Italian films